Yussef El Guindi (born 1960) is an Egyptian-American playwright.  He writes full-length, one-act, and adapted plays on Arab-Muslim experience in the United States. He is best known for his 2005 play Back of the Throat and has been called "the most talented Arab American writer of political plays."

Background

Yussef El Guindi was born in 1960 in Egypt.  His grandfather was director Zaki Toleimat, grandmother actress Rose al Yusuf, and his uncle writer Ihsan Abdel Koudous. At age three, he moved to London and received schooling in the UK and France.  In 1982, he received a BA from the American University in Cairo.  In 1983, he moved to the United States and received an MFA from Carnegie Mellon University.  He then moved to Seattle, Washington, where in 1996 he became a US citizen.

Career

El Guindi became associated with 'Chicago's Silk Road Theatre Project' (now Silk Road Rising), which produced three of his plays in quick succession.  He became playwright-in-residence at Duke University, where he also taught playwriting for seven years.

After the attacks of September 11, 2001, interest in Arab American theatre grew.  In 2005, his play Back of the Throat premiered, confronting anti-Arab sentiment in the US, and received notice from theatres, press, and academia.

Formerly literary manager in the early 2000s, El Guindi became an artistic associate at the Golden Thread Productions in San Francisco in the 2010s. In 2018, he also became a Core Company playwright member of ACT Theatre (Seattle).

Theatres that have produced El Guindi's plays include: The Fountain Theatre (Los Angeles), Furious Theatre Company (Pasadena), Artists Repertory Theatre (Portland), Portland Center Stage (Portland), ACT Theatre (Seattle), The Wilma Theater (Philadelphia), and Mosaic Theater Company (Washington DC). James Faerron has designed sets for his plays.

Awards

 2004: Northwest Playwrights' Competition from Theater Schmeater for Back of the Throat
 2005: Best New Play of 2005 by the Seattle Times for Back of the Throat
 2006: 
 After Dark/John W. Schmid Award for 10 Acrobats in an Amazing Leap of Faith 
 Excellence in Playwriting Award by LA Weekly for Back of the Throat
 2009:  M. Elizabeth Osborn Award from ACTA for Our Enemies: Lively Scenes of Love and Combat
 2010: 
 Middle East America Distinguished Playwright Award
 Edgerton Foundation New American Plays Award for Language Rooms
 2011:  
 Gregory Award for Pilgrims Musa and Sheri in the New World
 Footlight Award for Best World Premiere Play from Seattle Times for Pilgrims Musa and Sheri in the New World
 2012: Harold and Mimi Steinberg/ATCA New Play Award from ACTA forPilgrims Musa and Sheri in the New World
 2015: 
 Stranger Genius Award
 Best Original Script for Portland's Drammys for Threesome
 2016:  Santa Barbara Independent Indy Award for The Talented Ones

Works

"Guindi's works focus on themes of the immigrant experience, cultural and political climates, and current issues facing Arab-Americans and Muslim Americans."  El Guindi himself says that his plays may "pick Arab American or Muslim American characters... but they are essentially immigrant stories."  In analyzing his work, Anneka Esch-Van Kan wrote:   Language in El Guindi’s plays is the basis of any construction of reality. While language as a general capacity to speak and as a system of signs is the basis of all distinctions, the differences between several languages play an important role as well. The language one speaks determines one’s perspective on the world, and the translation of meaning from one language into another never works out with complete clarity.      Broadway Play Publishing, Dramatists Play Service and Theatre Forum have published El Guindi's plays.

Plays:
 Hostages and Finishing School (undated)
 Back of the Throat (2005)
 10 Acrobats in an Amazing Leap of Faith (2005)
 Jihad Jones and the Kalashnikov Babes (2008)
 Our Enemies: Lively Scenes of Love and Combat (2008)
 Language Rooms (2010)
 Pilgrims Musa and Sheri in the New World (2011)
 Threesome (2015)
 Collaborator (2016)
 The Talented Ones (2016)
 People of the Book (2019)

Books:
 Such a beautiful voice is Sayeda's and Karima's city (2006)
 Back of the Throat (2006)
 Jihad Jones and the Kalashnikov Babes (2014)
 Pilgrims Musa and Sheri in the New World (2014)
 Threesome (2016)
 Collaborator (2017)
 Hostages (2018)
 Ten Acrobats in an Amazing Leap of Faith (2018)
 The Talented Ones (2018)
 The Selected Works of Yussef El Guindi (2019)

Translations

Prof. Ebtessam El Shokrofy translated Yussef El Guindi's Back of Throat' 'into Arabic. It is published by State Publishing House in 2018.https://www.albiladpress.com/index.php/newspaper/3959/591325.html  
In addition, Abanoub Wagdy produced the translation of El Guindi's Ten Acrobats into Arabic. The translation is published by Anglo Egyptian Bookshop in 2022. https://www.elakhbarnews.com/%D8%A7%D9%84%D8%A3%D9%86%D8%AC%D9%84%D9%88-%D8%A7%D9%84%D9%85%D8%B5%D8%B1%D9%8A%D8%A9-%D8%AA%D8%B5%D8%AF%D8%B1-%D8%B9%D8%B4%D8%B1%D8%A9-%D8%A8%D9%87%D9%84%D9%88%D8%A7%D9%86%D8%A7%D8%AA-%D8%AA/Thus, El Guindi's works have hitherto only two Arabic translations.

Miscellaneous

Actor-director Orson Welles, director Howard Hawks, and writer William Faulkner visited El Guindi's family home.

Sometimes his name is transliterated from Arabic into English with the surname hyphenated: "Yussef El-Guindi."

See also

 Back of the Throat''
 Silk Road Theatre Project
 Golden Thread Productions
 List of Stranger Genius Awards winners
 Rose al Yusuf
 Ihsan Abdel Koudous
 Karim Alrawi
 Ra'ouf Mus'ad
 Sabrina Mahfouz
 Safaa Fathy
 Sara Shaarawi

References

External links
 
 Yussef El Guindi papers, 2000-2017
 PBS Writing an American Story: Playwright Yussef El Guindi (2016)
 WYNC: Yussef El Guindi and The Talented Ones
 Broadway World
 Robert A. Freedman Dramatic Agency
 Photos:
 Yussef El Guindi (NYT)
 Yussef El Guindi
 Yussef El Guindi

1960 births
Living people
Egyptian dramatists and playwrights
Egyptian male writers
Egyptian novelists
American dramatists and playwrights
American male writers
Male dramatists and playwrights
20th-century dramatists and playwrights
21st-century dramatists and playwrights
21st-century male writers
Writers from Cairo
20th-century male writers
The American University in Cairo alumni
Carnegie Mellon University alumni
American Muslims 
American people of Egyptian descent